Conlon Cecil O'Connor (February 21, 1923 – January 15, 2014) was an American professional basketball player and minor league baseball player. He played in the National Basketball League for the Detroit Gems in 1946–47 and averaged 5.4 points per game. In baseball, he played for the Newark Moundsmen in the Ohio State League in 1944 and 1945.

References 

1923 births
2014 deaths
American men's basketball players
Baseball players from South Dakota
Basketball players from South Dakota
Detroit Gems players
Forwards (basketball)
Newark Moundsmen players
People from Lincoln County, South Dakota